Vladimír Černík (9 July 1917 – 2 April 2002) was a Czechoslovakian tennis player. He was a mainstay of his country's Davis Cup team in the years immediately following World War II, helping them reach the Inter-Zonal final in successive years in 1947 and 1948, though they fell to Australia on both occasions. His biggest individual tournament victories in singles were his two Swiss International Championships in 1946 and 1950.

In July 1949, he and Davis Cup team-mate Jaroslav Drobný defected while attending that year's Swiss Championships in Gstaad. He continued to tour the amateur tennis circuit thereafter, first with Swiss papers until in 1950 he and Drobny were both granted Egyptian citizenship. Subsequently Černík was able to settle in the United States, and worked for two years as the Head Coach of the Tar Heels, the men's tennis programme at the University of North Carolina.

In later life Černík retired to Palm Beach, Florida, where he was the Tennis Professional at the Everglades Club. He died in 2002.

Performance timeline

References

External links
 
 
 

1917 births
2002 deaths
Czech male tennis players
Czechoslovak defectors
Czechoslovak male tennis players
People from Roudnice nad Labem
Sportspeople from the Ústí nad Labem Region